Şans (Chance) is the second studio album by Turkish singer Murat Boz. It was released on 25 February 2009 by Dokuz Sekiz Müzik. The album contains eleven new songs plus the singles of Boz's previous EP Uçurum. The release of the album marked Boz's second major work since Maximum (2007). Boz worked with Soner Sarıkabadayı, Ersay Üner, Fettah Can and Mustafa Ceceli for the album, and wrote some of the songs by himself.

The first music video from Şans was released for the song "Para Yok" on 9 January 2009. The music video for "Özledim", written by Fettah Can, was released on 16 April 2009. On 15 June, the music video for "Her Şeyi Yak" was released, followed by "Sallana Sallana" on 12 August, and "Gümbür Gümbür" on 15 December. The album's sixth music video was released for the song "İki Medeni İnsan", on which Soner Sarıkabadayı was featured. The album's last video was released on 9 September 2010 for the song "Buralardan Giderim".

Şans is a pop and R&B album. It generally received positive reviews from critics and won the Best Album award at the İstanbul FM Golden Awards.

Background and recording 
In Murat Boz's opinion, Şans was a more successful work compared to his previous album Maximum. The album was recorded in 2008. Boz discussed the album in an interview: "I'm very assertive because it's not an individual business; teamwork is very important. My team has been very solid on this album. I renewed the whole team. I'm a man who loves innovations and I'm growing more with innovations, and I've done what I needed to do in this album." He also stated the songs in the album contained a general meaning.

Composition

Music and lyrics 
The main songwriter for Şans is Soner Sarıkabadayı. Murat Boz also wrote three songs for the album. According to some critics, Boz was influenced by Tarkan in writing the songs.

Music videos 
The song "Para Yok" was chosen as the lead single of Şans, and its music video was released on 9 January 2009, two months before the album's release. In March 2009, it was announced that the song "Özledim", Fettah Can, would also be turned into a music video. It was directed by Murad Küçük and released on 16 April 2009. The third music video was made for the album's most outstanding song, "Her Şeyi Yak". It was directed by Emir Khalilzadeh and released on 15 June 2009. The music video for "Sallana Sallana" was made out of the footage of one of Boz's concerts and released on 12 August 2009. On 15 December 2009, the album's fifth music video, "Gümbür Gümbür", was released. It was followed by "İki Medeni İnsan". For the music video, the song's writer, Soner Sarıkabadayı, appeared as the featured artist, while the solo version was sold on digital platforms. The video was first broadcast on 11 February 2010 on Kral TV. The album's last music video, "Buralardan Giderim", was directed by Burak Ertaş and released on 9 September 2010.

Critical reception 

Şans received mixed reviews from music critics. Radioman Michael Kuyucu gave the album a favorable review. Kuyucu wrote in his review: "With a sound of good quality, compositions above the average, and a successful visual work, Murat Boz seems to increase his chance in the music industry with his album new album Şans," and mentioned that Boz had to do a good job in promoting the album. Gerçek Pop gave the album a negative review. The website chose "Özledim" as the most successful work in the album, and gave Şans two out of five stars.

Achievements 
On its first week of release, Şans ranked first on "D&R Best-Selling List" and "Esenshop Best-Selling List". According to MÜ-YAP, the album sold 17,000 copies within four months. "Özledim" was viewed over ten million times on YouTube, followed by "İki Medeni İnsan" with five million views, and the  songs "Sallana Sallana", "Buralardan Giderim" and "Gümbür Gümbür", which garnered one million views each.

Track listing

Personnel 
Credits adapted from Şanss album booklet.

 Dokuz Sekiz Müzik - production
 Ahmet Çelenk - producer
 İlhan Özcan - general coordinator
 Demet Karaduman - production coordinator
 Miles Showell / Metropolis / London - mastering
 Murat Boz - vocals, songwriter, composer
 Soner Sarıkabadayı - vocals, songwriter, composer
 Mert Ali İçelli - arranger, mixing, recording
 Ersay Üner - vocals, songwriter, composer
 Mustafa Ceceli - arranger, mixing, accordion
 Seda Seber - recording
 Yaşar Akpençe - goblet drum
 dB Music - studio
 Suat Aydoğan - director, arranger, keyboard
 Ferhan Taştekin - arranger assistant
 Sezgin Şengöz - arranger assistant

 Fettah Can - songwriter, composer
 Sinan Ceceli - arranger
 Erdem Sökmen - guitar
 Levent Demirbaş - studio
 İstanbul Strings - bowed string instruments
 Fatih Ahıskalı - cümbüş
 Ceyhun Çelikten - arranger
 Özgür Yedievli - arranger
 Gündem - bowed string instrument
 Sinem Yalçınkaya - backing vocals
 Gökhan Ertem - photography
 Elif Sakuçoğlu - stylist, management, press and public relations
 Cevat Aydın - hair
 Çetin Koyuncu - make-up
 Özgürarcan - graphics
 Esen - distribution

References

External links 
Şans on MusicBrainz
Şans on Discogs

Murat Boz albums
2009 albums